Master engineer may refer to:
Master engineer (rank), a warrant officer rank in the Royal Air Force
Mastering engineer, a technician in the music industry